Barnet United Reformed Church is a church in Wood Street, Chipping Barnet, London.

References

External links 

Churches in the London Borough of Barnet
United Reformed churches in London
Wood Street, Chipping Barnet